Hylettus seniculus is a species of longhorn beetle of the subfamily Lamiinae. It was described by Ernst Friedrich Germar in 1824 and is widely distributed throughout South America including Bolivia. It is also known from Costa Rica.

References

Beetles described in 1824
Beetles of South America
Hylettus